Dusty – The Dusty Springfield Musical is a jukebox musical by Jonathan Harvey based on the life and music of singer Dusty Springfield, featuring songs sung by Springfield.

Production 
The musical made its world premiere at the Theatre Royal, Bath from 23 June to 7 July 2018, before touring to Lyceum Theatre, Sheffield (10 to 14 July), Theatre Royal, Newcastle (17 to 21 July) and The Lowry, Salford (24 to 28 July). The production was directed by Maria Friedman and starring Katherine Kingsley in the title role.

Cast and characters

See also 

 Dusty – The Original Pop Diva, a 2006 Australian jukebox musical based on the life of Dusty Springfield

References

External links 
 

2018 musicals
Biographical musicals
Biographical plays about musicians
British musicals
Jukebox musicals
Plays set in the 20th century